GLGE may refer to:

 Greenville/Sinoe Airport (ICAO code GLGE)
 GLGE (programming library)